Garibald was the young son of Grimoald I of Benevento, king of the Lombards, and Theodota, daughter of Aripert I. After his father's death in 671, he reigned briefly for three months until the numerous adherents of Perctarit, his uncle, who had been exiled by Grimoald nine years earlier, besought their candidate to return and elected him, deposing the young king. He was the last Arian king in Europe.

Notes

References
Paulus Diaconus, Historia Langobardorum (c. 790). 
Oman, Charles. The Dark Ages 476-918. London, 1914.

650s births

671 deaths
Year of birth uncertain
7th-century Lombard monarchs

7th-century Arian Christians
Monarchs deposed as children
Medieval child monarchs